City Park West is a neighborhood of Denver, Colorado. It is a district of mostly single-family homes, small apartment buildings, and one very large hospital complex. The center of the district features the medical facilities of Presbyterian/St. Luke's Hospital, Exempla St. Joseph's Hospital, and a number of other medical office buildings and related facilities.  Exempla Saint Joseph's Hospital has embarked on a major
expansion project ($623 million) to create the newest, most modern hospital in Colorado. The new facility opened in December 2014.

Like many of Denver's Center City districts, City Park West is experiencing a number of smaller, multi-family infill projects on vacant or underutilized lots in among the mature landscape and classic early-20th century homes for which the district is known.  Also, the stretch of East Colfax along City Park West's southern boundary is showing evidence of new vitality and investment with great potential for additional infill projects along that important commercial corridor.

Boundaries
The neighborhood is bordered on the west by Downing Street, on the north by 23rd Avenue, on the east by York Street, and on the south by Colfax Avenue.

Landmarks
17th Avenue and 18th Avenue cross the neighborhood from east to west and are busy, one-way streets that are growing commercial areas with many popular neighborhood bars and restaurants.  City Park is on the eastern border of the neighborhood. The neighborhood is dominated by single-family houses, apartment blocks, and medical offices. Two of Denver's major hospitals are in the neighborhood: Exempla Saint Joseph Hospital and Presbyterian/St. Luke's Medical Center.

References

Neighborhoods in Denver